The Australian Digital Alliance (ADA) is an Australian non-profit coalition of public and private sector interests, formed to promote balanced copyright law by providing a voice for the public interest perspective in debates about copyright change and reform. The ADA engages with government through submissions, lobbying, and media activities.

The ADA works closely with its sister organisation, the Australian Libraries Copyright Committee (ALCC). The ALCC is the main consultative body and policy forum for the discussion of copyright issues affecting Australian libraries. It develops policy and advocates action appropriate for the role of libraries as information providers and preservers in Australia. The two bodies share a copyright adviser, and generally make joint submissions to government.

IceTV Pty Ltd v Nine Network Australia Pty Ltd (2009)   
The Nine Network sued IceTV for copyright infringement after IceTV used parts of Nine Network's programme schedules for its electronic program guide. The case raised questions about the threshold of the originality requirement for copyright, and the nature of the protection for compilations (collections of facts) in Australia.

The ADA was granted leave by the High Court of Australia to intervene as a friend of the court. The ADA's submissions outlined the importance of public interest considerations and the implications that this case could have on copyright users.

The High Court found in favour of IceTV, with the joint judgment of Gummow, Hayne and Heydon making reference to the ADA's submissions.  The High Court recognised the importance of maintaining a robust public domain which allows people and organisations to use, re-use and build on materials to produce innovative new works.

A User’s Guide to the Flexible Dealing Provision 

Together with the ALCC, the ADA produced a handbook on the new flexible dealing provision of the Copyright Act (section 200AB). The handbook outlines how the provision operates and provides examples to assist libraries, archives, galleries and educational institutions to take advantage of the provision and use copyright materials.

The formal launch of the handbook was attended by ADA members, senior public servants, and other copyright figures. The Flexible Dealing Handbook is available for free download under Creative Commons license.

Anti-Counterfeiting Trade Agreement 

Significantly increased intermediary responsibility, among other things, is currently the subject of negotiations in the proposed Anti-Counterfeiting Trade Agreement (ACTA). The ADA encouraged greater transparency by the Department of Foreign Affairs and Trade (DFAT) regarding the progress of its negotiations.

The ADA formed a coalition with other concerned organisations including Choice, the Australian Library and Information Association, and the Internet Industry Association. The coalition was involved in a number of government meetings, and submitted a joint statement of principles for ACTA negotiations to DFAT.

The submission agreed that reducing counterfeiting is important where it endangers consumer health or safety, or constitutes commercial scale infringement. However, the coalition urged that pursuit of that goal should not threaten legitimate commercial, social, innovative and creative activities, the rights of consumers or the free flow of information. The coalition noted the current proposed treaty raised concerns with respect to transparency, increased customs search powers, increased penalties for IP infringement, and lack of due process.

References

External links
 Australian Digital Alliance

Political advocacy groups in Australia
Non-profit organisations based in the Australian Capital Territory
Australian copyright law
Copyright law organizations